John Price (April 10, 1883 – April 8, 1956) was a Canadian politician. He served in the Legislative Assembly of British Columbia from 1933 to 1937 from the electoral district of Vancouver East, a member of the Co-operative Commonwealth Federation. He was a motorman with the British Columbia Electric Railway and also served as an alderman on the Vancouver City Council in the 1940s. He died of a heart attack in 1956.

References

1883 births
1956 deaths